"We Belong Together" is a song written, composed and performed by Randy Newman for the 2010 film Toy Story 3. The song was nominated for several Best Original Song awards from various film society and awards committees. The song won the Academy Award for Best Original Song at the 83rd Academy Awards in February 2011.

Description

It is the first song on the film score of Toy Story 3.  The entire album was composed and conducted by Randy Newman.  Upon the film's release, Disney did not release the soundtrack album for Toy Story 3 on CD. It was only available as a music download in lossy formats such as MP3 and AAC, until January 2012, when Walt Disney Records and Intrada Records released the soundtrack on CD.

Cover versions
Brian Wilson covered the song on his 2011 album, In the Key of Disney.

Awards

When Newman accepted his Oscar, which was presented by Jennifer Hudson, his speech was a humorous one that Moviefone.com says "stole the show". He made fun of advice he was given that "it's not really good television to take a list out of your pocket and thank a lot of people", saying that "I just have to thank these people. I don't want to. I want to be good television so badly."

It was nominated for the Broadcast Film Critics Association Award for Best Song at the 16th Annual BFCA Critics Choice Awards in 2011 and Best Original Song at the 2010 Denver Film Critics Society, losing both to "If I Rise" by A. R. Rahman and Dido. It lost Best Original Song awards to Cher's "You Haven't Seen the Last of Me" at the Phoenix Film Critics Society Awards 2010 and "I See the Light", from the film Tangled, at the 1st Annual Awards.com Movie Awards.

Notes

Brian Wilson songs
Randy Newman songs
Songs from Toy Story
Songs written by Randy Newman
2010s ballads
2010 singles
2010 songs
Best Original Song Academy Award-winning songs
American songs
Walt Disney Records singles